The siege of Mantinea occurred in 385 BC, and resulted in a victory of the Spartans over the city of Mantinea, which was defeated and dismembered. On this occasion, Epaminondas, then fighting on the side of the Spartans, famously rescued his fellow Theban Pelopidas.

Mantinea had been opposed to the Spartans in the Peloponesian War. As a result, Mantinea first fell in 417, and it was then destroyed in the siege of 385 BC. However, the Arcadians were able to recover and restored their city after the Battle of Leuctra and the defeat of Spartan hegemony.

References

385 BC
Mantinea
Mantinea
Mantinea